Javier O. Huerta is a Mexican American and Chicano poet. His first book Some Clarifications y otros poemas (Arte Publico 2007) was awarded the Chicano/Latino Literary Prize from the University of California at Irvine.

Personal background 
Huerta was born in Nuevo Laredo, Tamaulipas, Mexico and immigrated to the United States with his mother and younger brother, crossing the Rio Grande (Rio Bravo) in 1981. In 1986, he gained legal residency under the Immigration Reform and Control Act of 1986 and became a US citizen in January 2000 after serving four years in the United States Navy. , he resides in the Bay Area, California.

Professional background 
Huerta also studies the laughter of poetry in the English PhD program at the University of California at Berkeley, where he teaches the following courses, "Politics and Poetics of Refusal," "Documents and the Literature of the Undocumented," and "Laughter and Literature."

References 

Year of birth missing (living people)
Living people
People from Nuevo Laredo
Mexican emigrants to the United States
American poets of Mexican descent
University of California, Berkeley faculty
Writers from the San Francisco Bay Area